Ulrich Beiger (26 August 1918 – 18 September 1996) was a German actor.

Selected filmography

 The Little Residence (1942) - Möller
 The Trip to Marrakesh (1949) - Mixer
 Sensation in Savoy (1950) - young Indian
 Scandal at the Embassy (1950)
 Die Sehnsucht des Herzens (1951) - resident physician
 One Night's Intoxication (1951) - Dr. Felix Fichtner
 The Imaginary Invalid (1952) - Rolf
 The Forester's Daughter (1952) - Simmerl
 The White Horse Inn (1952) - Sigismund
 The Little Town Will Go to Sleep (1954)
 Clivia (1954)
 Portrait of an Unknown Woman (1954) - auctioneer
 The Confession of Ina Kahr (1954)
 Oasis (1955) - hairdresser
 Silence in the Forest (1955) - Diener Martin
 The Major and the Bulls (1955) - CIC-Lieutenant Houseman
 Manöverball (1956) - Adjutant
  (1957) - Prince Ali Hussni
  (1958) - Mario Marinadi
  (1958)
 The Shepherd from Trutzberg (1959) - Heini von Seeburg
  (1959) - Dr. Friedhelm von Säuerlich, domain administrator
 Der Frosch mit der Maske (1959) - Everett
 The Crimson Circle (1960) - Osborne
 Oh! This Bavaria! (1960)
 The Terrible People (1960) - Mr. Henry
 The Forger of London (1961) - Inspector Rouper
  (1961) - Sigismund
 Max the Pickpocket (1962) - entertainer
 Freddy and the Song of the South Pacific (1962) 
 The Great Escape (1963) - Preissen
 Don't Tell Me Any Stories (1964) - patron in typing pool
 The Gentlemen (1965) - Grischa - episode 'Die Bauern'
  (1966, TV miniseries) - Duncan
 Onkel Filser – Allerneueste Lausbubengeschichten (1966) - chairman (uncredited)
  (1968) - chief inspector
  (1968, TV film) - Dr. Eisenreich
  (1969) - Prof. Hasemann
 Die Feuerzangenbowle (1970) - Member of the Round table
 Who Laughs Last, Laughs Best (1971) - Richard Mertens
 Mädchen beim Frauenarzt (1971) - Karin's Father
 Twenty Girls and the Teachers (1971)
 Aunt Trude from Buxtehude (1971) - bank manager
  (1971) - Italian shepherd
 Jailbreak in Hamburg (1971) - Berndorf
 Die Klosterschülerinnen (1972) - Alwin Achsmann
 Crazy – Completely Mad (1973) - doctor
 Geh, zieh dein Dirndl aus (1973) - Conte Traverso
  (1974) - Morelli
 Three Men in the Snow (1974) - prosecutor
 Es knallt – und die Engel singen (1974) - Don Rosario, the Godfather
 Charley's Nieces (1974) - Dr. Stingl
 Oktoberfest! Da kann man fest... (1974) - Kovac
 No Sin on the Alpine Pastures (1974) - doctor
 The Maddest Car in the World (1975) - Marchese de la Pozzi
 Schulmädchen-Report 9: Reifeprüfung vor dem Abitur (1975) - Hubert, Lilo's father (uncredited)
  (1975)
 Lady Dracula (1977)
 Schulmädchen-Report 11. Teil - Probieren geht über Studieren (1977) - Prosecutor Jenkel (uncredited)
  (1977) - Commissar Ramirez
 Natascha – Todesgrüße aus Moskau (1977)
 Schulmädchen-Report 12. Teil - Wenn das die Mammi wüßte (1978) - Ottokar Kuppler (uncredited)
  (1979)
 Laß laufen, Kumpel (1981)
 The Confessions of Felix Krull (1982, TV miniseries)
  (1987) 
 Driving Me Crazy (1991) - Klein

References

External links
 

1918 births
1996 deaths
German male film actors
Male actors from Munich
20th-century German male actors